Widford is a deserted medieval village on the River Windrush about  east of Burford in West Oxfordshire. The village was an exclave of Gloucestershire until 1844.

History
Early occupation is evidenced by the remains of a Roman villa. The Church of England parish church of St. Oswald stands on its site, and a small area of Roman mosaic was visible in its chancel, but has been moved to Cirencester museum.  The Domesday Book of 1086 recorded that St Oswald's Priory in Gloucester held the manor of Widford. It was a detached part of Gloucestershire until the 19th century. St Oswald's church in Widford is Early English Gothic and was built in the 13th century. In the 14th century numerous wall paintings were added, remains of which survive. Most of the church's present windows were added in the 16th and 17th centuries.

Widford was a substantial village in the Middle Ages but today only the 16th-century manor house and a few other houses remain. St. Oswald's stands in a field whose cropmarks show the outlines of former buildings.  In 1844 the Counties (Detached Parts) Act 1844 transferred Widford to Oxfordshire.  Widford was a civil parish from 1866, but by 1931 its population was only 29.  In 1932 the civil parish was merged with the parish of Swinbrook to form the civil parish of Swinbrook and Widford.

References

Sources and further reading

External links

Villages in Oxfordshire
West Oxfordshire District
Deserted medieval villages in Oxfordshire
Former civil parishes in Oxfordshire